Stoyan Gadev (1931–1999) was a Bulgarian stage and film actor.

He is probably best known for the role of Stoil the Haidouk in the popular TV series Captain Petko Voivode (1981) written by Nikolay Haytov. Gadev is also known for his colourful appearances in classic film productions as The Tied Up Balloon (1967), Eternal Times (1974), A Cricket in the Ear (1976) and King for a Day (1983).

Stoyan Gadev started his career on the stage at the theatres of Burgas, Sliven, Dimitrovgrad and Pernik before joining the troupe of the Youth Theatre, Sofia. In the beginning of the 1990s, he was briefly a member of the Municipal Theatre Sofia.

Stoyan Gadev was decorated with the high government prize the Order of Saints Cyril and Methodius.

Filmography

References

Sources

External links 
 

Bulgarian male film actors
Bulgarian male stage actors
Bulgarian male television actors
1931 births
1999 deaths
People from Yambol Province
20th-century Bulgarian male actors